The Supermarine Type 322 was a prototype British carrier-borne torpedo, dive bomber and reconnaissance aircraft of the Second World War. A single-engined monoplane, it was unsuccessful, with only two examples being built. The Fairey Barracuda, built to the same specification, would fill this role.

Design and development
The Type 322 was designed by Supermarine to meet a 1937 requirement (Specification S.24/37) for a replacement for the British Royal Navy's Fairey Albacore biplane (even though the Albacore was yet to fly, with orders placed both with Supermarine, and with Fairey Aviation for what became the Barracuda. Supermarine's design was a high-wing monoplane, originally intended to be powered by the Rolls-Royce Exe engine.  Unusually it featured a variable-incidence wing, first demonstrated on the French Paul Schmitt biplane at the Paris Airshow in 1913.

Variable incidence allowed the fuselage to be kept at the optimum angle for good visibility whilst maintaining lift – particularly useful for a carrier-borne aircraft and with tail-wheel undercarriage.  The incidence could be varied from 2 degrees when the flap setting was neutral, to 16 degrees when the flaps were lowered to 60 degrees.  The lift coefficient with the wing at this setting was 3.9 (double that of conventional and contemporary aircraft), giving a stalling speed of 57 knots. Since it was intended for carrier use, the wing also folded – a remarkable technical achievement in view of the small increase in structural weight involved. The undercarriage was a fixed tailwheel type to save complexity. It would have been very challenging to retract the landing gear into the wings. It was primarily of wooden construction, in common with the Armstrong Whitworth Albemarle bomber since, when it was being built, there was a danger of light alloy being in short supply.  The Exe was cancelled in 1938, and the Rolls-Royce Merlin was substituted in the design.

Operational history
Two Type 322s, nicknamed "Dumbo" owing to the types corpulent appearance, were built.  Originally due for completion in early 1941, the project was delayed owing to the high priority then in force for the production of Spitfires. The first prototype (R1810) flew on 6 February 1943, followed by the second prototype (R1815) with the Merlin 32 in place of the Merlin 30, a four-blade rotol constant speed airscrew, a tail of greater area and alclad covered outer wings.  By this time, however, Fairey's competing design had entered service as the Fairey Barracuda, and the two Type 322s were used as experimental aircraft. A developed version was planned as the Supermarine Type 380.  It was also intended that this wing technology was to the incorporated in a replacement for the Sea Otter – variable incidence benefiting seaplanes where the optimum angle of the floats can be maintained during takeoff and landing.

Postwar, R1815 was retained by the company and was used in 1946 for chase in the low-speed handling trials of the Supermarine Attacker jet fighter.

Specifications (S.24/37)

See also

References

Notes

Citations

Bibliography

 Andrews, C.F. and E.B. Morgan. Supermarine Aircraft since 1914. London: Putnam, 1987. .
 Brown, Capt. Eric. Wings of the Weird & Wonderful. London: Airlife, 1985, pp. 120–127. .
 
 Chorlton, Martyn. Supermarine: Company Profile 1913–1963. Cudham, Kent, UK: Kelsey Publishing Group (Aeroplane), 2012. .
 Mason Francis K. The British Bomber since 1914. London: Putnam, 1994. .
 Thetford, Owen. Aircraft of the Fighting Powers, Vol. VII. Hertfordshire, UK: Argus Books Limited, 1946 (Facsimile Edition 1979. Rochester: Staples Printers (Stanhope Press), pp. 31–32. .)

External links
Supermarine S.24/37 – British aircraft of World War II
Flight Magazine photographic archive 25 April 1946 page 412, accessed 29 January 2010
"Variable Incidence" a 1946 Flight article

1940s British bomber aircraft
Cancelled military aircraft projects of the United Kingdom
Type 322
Variable-incidence-wing aircraft
World War II torpedo bombers
Carrier-based aircraft
Single-engined tractor aircraft
High-wing aircraft
Aircraft first flown in 1943